"Let Down" is the debut single and first published song recorded by American singer-songwriter Paris Jackson. The song was written by Jackson and produced by Manchester Orchestra's Andy Hull. It was released on October 30, 2020 by Republic Records as the lead single from her debut album Wilted.

References

2020 songs
2020 debut singles
Republic Records singles
Songs about heartache
Paris Jackson songs
2020 singles